The following is a list of the CHUM Chart number-one singles of 1962.

See also
1962 in music

References

1962
Canada Chum
1962 in Canadian music